Zohara is an Israeli singer-songwriter, musician, producer and composer based in Tel Aviv. Her production is drawn from many influences; electronic music and pop as well as classical music and jazz.

Career 
Between 2012 and 2014, in her room in Tel Aviv, Zohara produced her first album Growing up Anyways, released in 2016. The album is made of 12 original songs that mostly deal with the doubts of people in their early twenties.

In 2013 Zohara performed in Israel and London and made music videos. The videos were released in 2014–2015. One song, ‘Drum & Bass’, broadcast on MTV World, and her song ‘Lost’ premiered on British magazine Konbini.

In 2017 Zohara became the lead singer of the British band ‘Oi Va Voi’. Their album Memory Drop was released by V2 in 2018, to critical acclaim, and was featured in The Guardian, Evening Standard and Songlines. The band appeared on The Tom Robinson Show (BBC 6 Music), Clive Anderson (BBC 4), the Dutch TV show Nijverheid, and sold out both of their London shows at Omeara and Islington Assembly Hall. They finished 2018 touring in Germany, Holland, Russia, Turkey, and Israel. In 2019, Zohara performed at The Royal Academy of Arts as part of Anthony Gormley's exhibition, headlined The Shacklewell Arms, supported Audiobooks at Electrowerkz and Paper Dress Vintage, and continued touring Europe as the lead singer of Oi Va Voi. In 2020, Zohara signed to Studio Bruxo, established by sound artist David Wrench who worked with artists such as Frank Ocean, Caribou, Glass Animals, Arlo Parks, Manics, Goldfrapp, David Byrne, Erasure, XX, FKA Twigs, Sampha, and Jungle.

Discography

Singles

Albums

References

External links 
 Zohara's official website
 ZOHARA on Facebook
 Zohara on YouTube

1988 births
Living people
21st-century Israeli women singers
Israeli electronic musicians
Place of birth missing (living people)
People from Tel Aviv
Israeli women record producers